Juuso Hietanen (born 14 June 1985) is a Finnish professional ice hockey defenceman for HPK of the Liiga.

Playing career
Hietanen made his SM-liiga debut with HPK during the 2003–04 season, and two years later he became a regular player on the team. He also visited Pelicans early in his career and was part of the Finnish national junior team in the 2005 World Junior Ice Hockey Championships. At the time of his SM-liiga debut, he was the first third generation player in the top level of Finnish ice hockey. In 2006 he celebrated the championship with HPK. He scored two goals and an assist in the second final, but HPK suffered its only loss in the series.

In 2007, he moved to Sweden to play in the Elitserien with Brynäs IF and for 2010–11 season he signed with HV71.

Hietanen played in the Kontinental Hockey League (KHL) during 2011 to 2021, first with Torpedo Nizhny Novgorod and later with Dynamo Moscow.

After 15 seasons abroad, Hietanen opted to return to Finland as a free agent and re-joined original club, HPK of the Liiga, on an optional three-year contract on 22 April 2022.

International play

Hietanen was selected for Finnish national team in 2010 IIHF World Championship.

Personal life
Hietanen's father Juha Hietanen and grandfather Aarno Hietanen also played professional ice hockey.

Career statistics

Regular season and playoffs

International

References

External links

 
 
 

1985 births
HC Ambrì-Piotta players
Brynäs IF players
HC Dynamo Moscow players
Finnish expatriate ice hockey players in Switzerland
Finnish expatriate ice hockey players in Sweden
Finnish expatriate ice hockey players in Russia
Finnish ice hockey defencemen
HPK players
HV71 players
Lahti Pelicans players
Living people
Olympic ice hockey players of Finland
Ice hockey players at the 2014 Winter Olympics
Ice hockey players at the 2018 Winter Olympics
Ice hockey players at the 2022 Winter Olympics
Medalists at the 2014 Winter Olympics
Medalists at the 2022 Winter Olympics
Olympic gold medalists for Finland
Olympic bronze medalists for Finland
Olympic medalists in ice hockey
People from Hämeenlinna
Torpedo Nizhny Novgorod players
Sportspeople from Kanta-Häme